Cine Animadores is a Chilean animation film studio. One of the few full-based animation studios in the country and Latin America, Cine Animadores worked in his first years with TV commercials and later in the final years of the 1990s they started to work on music videos, animated TV series, Flash animation and animated feature films, with the creation of Ogu and Mampato in Rapa Nui, the first modern feature-length animated movie of Chile in 2002.

History
Founded in 1989, Cine Animadores was originally created as a publicity company specialized in hand-draw animation for TV commercials exclusively for the Chilean television.

Years later, Cine Animadores released in 1997 his first non-TV commercial work, the music video of La Torre de Babel by the Chilean group Los Tres. The traditional animated video was praised by critics and Los Tres fans and is considered as one of the most classic music videos created in Chile.

After this work, Cine Animadores make an agreement with Themo Lobos for the production of Ogu and Mampato in Rapa Nui. Released in 2002, the film was considered "historic" in Chile because although the film isn't the first featured animated production made in Chile, is the second in the history of Chilean cinema since Alfredo Serey's 1921 film . (English: The Transmission of Presidential Control) and is considered as the first "modern" feature-length animated film of the country. The film got very good to decent reviews by critics and was submitted as a nominated for the Academy Award for Best Foreign Language Film in 2002.

Since then Cine Animadores has continued his production on animated movies and now TV series for the Chilean channel Canal 13 and also animated commercials for Disney, Peanuts and The Simpsons.

Featured projects

Films

Television

TV Series
I-Pop (2004)

Music

Music Videos
La Torre de Babel by Los Tres (1997)

Internet

Flash Series
El Santos vs. la Tetona Mendoza (2003, based on an original Mexican comic strip)
Johnny Bravo (flash shorts for Cartoon Network Europe)

References

External links 
 Cine Animadores website (official in Spanish)

Chilean animation
Mass media in Santiago
Mass media companies established in 1989